Louisa Bisby (born 1 June 1979) is an Australian football (soccer) player, born in England, who last played for Melbourne Victory in the Australian W-League, and with the Matildas representing Australia. A knee injury ended Bisby's 2012 season with Melbourne Victory in October.

References

1979 births
Living people
Australian women's soccer players
Melbourne Victory FC (A-League Women) players
English emigrants to Australia
Sportspeople from Leamington Spa
Women's association football midfielders